Basava Jayanthi is a holiday traditionally observed by the Lingayats of the Indian state of Karnataka. It marks the birthday of Basavanna, a 12th-century poet-philosopher and the founding saint of the Lingayat tradition. The holiday is celebrated throughout South India, primarily in Karnataka, Maharashtra, Telangana and Andhra Pradesh.

Basavanna believed in a society free of the caste system, with equal opportunity for all. He founded the Anubhava Mantapa, an academy which included Lingayat mystics, saints, and philosophers.

References 

Culture of Karnataka
Lingayatism
Hindu festivals
Birthdays
Religious festivals in India